Georgia State Route 5 Connector may refer to:

 Georgia State Route 5 Connector (Canton): a connector route of State Route 5 that exists in Canton
 Georgia State Route 5 Connector (Cobb County): a former connector route of State Route 5 that existed in Cobb County
 Georgia State Route 5 Connector (Kennesaw): a connector route of State Route 5 that partially exists in Kennesaw; part of the Ernest W. Barrett Parkway
 Georgia State Route 5 Connector (Marietta): a former connector route of State Route 5 that existed in Marietta

005 Connector